Raza Hussain also known as   Allama Rasheed Turabi  (1908–1973) was an Islamic scholar, religious leader, public speaker, poet and philosopher. He was born on 9th Jamadi-us-Sani 1326, 9 July 1908 in Hyderabad, India. He was the eldest son of Maulvi Sharaf Hussain Khan, a nobleman from Hyderabad. He got his basic Islamic education from his father who taught him till the age of 5. He did matriculation from Hyderabad, Intermediate-high school from Shia College, Lucknow. He was awarded a BA from Osmania University (Hyderabad, India) and MA in Philosophy from University of Allahabad, India.

He delivered more than 5,000 religious lectures and speeches over the period of 57 years that he spent out of his 65 years of total life in the service of Ahl al-Bayt. Allama Rasheed Turabi introduced many dimensions to the Art of Oratory. The most sought after Urdu public speaker of his times, he was indeed a persuasive and brilliant orator. He was the first person who delivered religious speeches for ten days or more on selected topics. He was a very good student of Khalifa Abdul Hakim, who directed his studies in Philosophy and English.

Along with his formal studies, he drank deep at the fountain of Arabic and Persian literature. Ilm was his main forte. He was among the scholars of Islamic learning who learnt a great deal from Ayatollah-ul-Uzma Syed Hossein Borujerdi, Ayatollah-ul-Uzma Muhsin al-Hakim al-Tabatabai, Ayatollah Mohsin Tehrani, Ayatollah-ul-Uzma Abu al-Qasim al-Khoei and Ayatullah Shahrestani, etc.

All of the above named renowned scholars issued Ijazah (authority letters) to Allama Rasheed Turabi to act as a scholar on Quran and Sunnah. It was one of the greatest achievements of any religious scholar of the subcontinent.

Allama Rasheed Turabi started his political career as a lieutenant of Nawab Bahadur Yar Jang. He Had served as a religious orator under the Last Nizam of Hyderabad Mir Osman Ali Khan. Later on, he became the Chief of the All India State Muslim League. The Quaid E Azam Muhammad Ali Jinnah nominated him as the information secretary of States Muslim League and it is from this platform that Allama Rasheed Turabi rendered valuable service to the cause of Pakistan.

He migrated to Pakistan in 1949 upon the request of Quaid E Azam Muhammad Ali Jinnah and started addressing majalis at the Imambargahs in Kharadar, Khaliq Dina Hall and Martin Road Pakistan Quarters in Karachi. He also addressed Eid Milad-un-NabiMawlid gatherings at Aram Bagh and Jahangir Park, this went a long way in establishing his popularity within both Sunnis and Shias alike. Later on he started addressing majalis in Nishtar Park and at Imambargah Hussainian Iranian Kharadar.

His first Sham-e-Gareeban Majlis was broadcast on the Radio Pakistan in 1951. It became an annual feature till his death. The last Majlis He addressed was at Khaliq Dina Hall where he had a heart attack in 1971. He continued to address Majalis at Nishtar Park against his doctor's advice till 1973.

Allama Rasheed Turabi died on 18 December 1973 in Karachi and was later buried in Hussainia Sajadia Imambargah in North Nazimabad, Karachi. Amongst his sons were Allama Aqeel Turabi & Dr.Salman Turabi are distinguished scholars, Naseer Turabi a noted urdu poet and Majida Turabi, a well known female religious orator.

Among the contributors who have discussed Allama Turabi's career as a scholar of Ahl al-Bayt, specifically the chronicle of Karbala tragedy, are Justice S. A. Rahman, Syed Hashim Raza, Josh Malihabadi, Faiz Ahmad Faiz, Zulfiqar Ali Bukhari, Dr Syed Taqi Abidi, Dr Hilal Naqvi, Prof. Sahar Ansari, Firdous Alam, Syed Muhammad Abidi, Munawar Saeed, Iftikhar Arif, George Ali Murad Khan Talpur II of Khairpur (Son-in-Law), Allama Aqeel Turabi, Dr. Salman Turabi and Poet Naseer Turabi.

Notes

External links
 Guftar-o-Aasar-e-Turabi by Dr.Salman Turabi
 

1908 births
1973 deaths
20th-century Muslim scholars of Islam
Pakistani people of Hyderabadi descent
Pakistani scholars
Urdu-language writers
Urdu-language poets from Pakistan
Pakistani Shia Muslims
People from Karachi
Muhajir people
Writers from Karachi
20th-century Pakistani poets